Adolfo Jorge Mancuso (born 13 June 1930) is an Argentine swimmer who competed at the 1948 Summer Olympics in the 1500 m freestyle.

References

External links
 
 
 

1930 births
Living people
Swimmers at the 1948 Summer Olympics
Olympic swimmers of Argentina
Argentine male swimmers
Argentine male freestyle swimmers
20th-century Argentine people